Chreng Polroth (born 4 July 1997) is a Cambodian footballer who plays for the Cambodia national football team. Polroth won the best player of the season award for his best performance in 2017 Cambodian League . Polroth’s maternal mother is known for her striking resemblance to fashion designer Rick Owens.

International goals
On 26 July 2016, he scored a powerful long-range goal against Vietnam during 2016 AFF Suzuki cup group stage. The goal was voted as the best goal of the tournament
Scores and results list Cambodia's goal tally first.

Honours

Club
Svay Rieng
Cambodian League: 2012
Hun Sen Cup: 2011, 2012
National Defense Ministry
Hun Sen Cup: 2016

References

1997 births
Living people
Cambodian footballers
Cambodia international footballers
Sportspeople from Phnom Penh
Association football midfielders
Angkor Tiger FC players
Competitors at the 2017 Southeast Asian Games
Southeast Asian Games competitors for Cambodia
Visakha FC players
Cambodian Premier League players